Patrick Henry Meenan (September 24, 1927 – August 16, 2001) was a Wyoming politician accountant, and radio station owner.

Meenan served as mayor of Casper, Wyoming and as speaker of the Wyoming House of Representatives.  He was a member of the Wyoming House  from 1968-1988. He was a Republican.

Meenan was trained as an accountant. He was also the owner of KATI and KAWY radio stations from 1957 to 1981.

Meenan began as a member of the Casper City council in the 1950s. From 1962-1965 he was mayor of Casper. Under his administration the number of paved streets in the city was significantly increased.

He and his wife Shirley were the parents of four children.

Sources
Billings Gazette article on Meenan's death

1928 births
Republican Party members of the Wyoming House of Representatives
Mayors of places in Wyoming
2001 deaths
20th-century American politicians
Politicians from Casper, Wyoming